Ève Turcotte is a Canadian set decorator. She is most noted for her work on the film The Time Thief (L'Arracheuse de temps), for which she, Jean Babin and Arnaud Brisebois won the Canadian Screen Award for Best Art Direction/Production Design at the 10th Canadian Screen Awards in 2022.

References

External links

Canadian set decorators
Canadian women in film
Best Art Direction/Production Design Genie and Canadian Screen Award winners
French Quebecers
Living people
Year of birth missing (living people)